Dunsandle railway station opened in 1890 as the only intermediate station on the Loughrea & Attymon branch line.  It closed on 3 November 1975.   the station and its surrounds and associated rolling stock are privately owned.

References

External links 

 Old Dunsandle Railway Station website
 Dunsandle Railway Station on Facebook

Disused railway stations in County Galway
Railway stations opened in 1890
Railway stations closed in 1975